The 2020 PBA D-League Aspirants' Cup was the ninth Aspirants' Cup season of the PBA D–League, the official minor league basketball organization owned by the Philippine Basketball Association (PBA). The conference commenced on February 13. However, the COVID-19 pandemic has been a concern for the league organizers, halting the season opening as a preventive measure against the outbreak. The conference started on March 2 but the league forced indefinite suspension of games nine days later.

On September 30, 2020, PBA commissioner Willie Marcial announced that the tournament has been officially canceled.

Format 
Twelve teams participate in the conference. The tournament will be conducted in four stages:
 Single round-robin elimination, where a team plays the other teams once. The six teams with the worst records are eliminated. The top two placers advance to the semifinals outright.
 The quarterfinals, #3 seeded team faces #6 seeded team and #4 seeded team plays the #5 seeded team. Higher seeds possess the twice-to-beat advantage.
 The semifinals, #1 seeded team faces the winner of #4 vs #5 quarterfinals while #2 seeded team plays the winner of #3 vs #6 quarterfinals. This is a best-of-three playoff.
 The finals, which is a best-of-three series.

Venues 
Most games will be played at the Ynares Sports Arena in Pasig. Other venues include the Paco Arena in Manila and JCSGO Gym in Quezon City. Filoil Flying V Centre was only used on the opening games of the season.

Teams 
The following are the participating teams:

Elimination round

Team standings

Schedule

Results

References 

Aspirants' Cup
2020
2019–20 in Philippine basketball leagues
PBA D-League